Statistics of Lebanese Premier League for the 2000–01 season.

Temporary Official Final table

Revoked Final table

References
RSSSF

Lebanese Premier League seasons
Leb
2000–01 in Lebanese football
2000–01 Lebanese Premier League